Dynactin subunit 1 is a protein that in humans is encoded by the DCTN1 gene.

Function 

This gene encodes the largest subunit of dynactin, a macromolecular complex consisting of 23 subunits (11 individual proteins ranging in size from 22 to 150 kD). Dynactin binds to cytoplasmic dynein, dynein cargo adaptors, and microtubules. It is involved in a diverse array of cellular functions, including ER-to-Golgi transport, the centripetal movement of lysosomes and endosomes, spindle formation, chromosome movement, nuclear positioning, and axonogenesis.

This subunit is commonly referred to p150-glued.  It is present in two copies per dynactin complex and forms an ≈75 nm long flexible arm that extends from the main body of dynactin.  The p150-glued arm contains binding sites for microtubules, the microtubule plus tip binding protein EB1, and the N-terminus of the dynein intermediate chain.

Alternative splicing of this gene results in at least 2 functionally distinct isoforms: a ubiquitously expressed one and a brain-specific one. Based on its cytogenetic location, this gene is considered as a candidate gene for limb-girdle muscular dystrophy.

Interactions 

DCTN1 has been shown to interact with:
 BBS4, 
 Dystonin,
 Grb2,  and
 RAB6A.

References

Further reading

External links 
  GeneReviews/NIH/NCBI/UW entry on Perry syndrome